Orekhov is a rural locality (a khutor) in Perekopskoye Rural Settlement, Kletsky District, Volgograd Oblast, Russia. The population was 150 as of 2010. There are 3 streets.

Geography 
Orekhov is located in steppe, on Don Ridge, 20 km southeast of Kletskaya (the district's administrative centre) by road. Kletskaya is the nearest rural locality.

References 

Rural localities in Kletsky District